The following is a list and timeline of innovations as well as inventions and discoveries that involved British people or the United Kingdom including predecessor states in the history of the formation of the United Kingdom. This list covers innovation and invention in the mechanical, electronic, and industrial fields, as well as medicine, military devices and theory, artistic and scientific discovery and innovation, and ideas in religion and ethics.

Factors that historians note spurred innovation and discovery include the 17th century scientific revolution and the 18th/19th century industrial revolution. Another possible influence is British the patent system which had medieval origins and was codified with the Patent Act of 1852.

17th century 

1605
Bacon's cipher, a method of steganography (hiding a secret message), is devised by Sir Francis Bacon.

1614
 John Napier publishes his work Mirifici Logarithmorum Canonis Descriptio introducing the concept of logarithms which simplifies mathematical calculations.

1620
 The first navigable submarine is designed by William Bourne and built by Dutchman Cornelius Drebbel.

1625
 Early experiments in water desalination are conducted by Sir Francis Bacon.

1657 
 Anchor escapement for clock making is invented by Robert Hooke.

1667
 A tin can telephone is devised by Robert Hooke.

1668
 Sir Isaac Newton invents the first working reflecting telescope.

1698
 The first commercial steam-powered device, a water pump, is developed by Thomas Savery.

18th century

1701
 An improved seed drill is designed by Jethro Tull. It is used to spread seeds around a field with a rotating handle which makes seed planting a lot easier.

1705
 Edmond Halley makes the first prediction of a comet's return.
1712
 The first practical steam engine is designed by Thomas Newcomen.
1718
 Edmond Halley discovers stellar motion.

1730
 The Rotherham plough, the first plough to be widely built in factories and commercially successful, is patented by Joseph Foljambe.

1737
 Andrew Rodger invents the winnowing machine.

1740
 The first electrostatic motors are developed by Andrew Gordon in the 1740s.

1744
 The earliest known reference to baseball is made in a publication, A Little Pretty Pocket-Book, by John Newbery. It contains a rhymed description of "base-ball" and a woodcut that shows a field set-up somewhat similar to the modern game—though in a triangular rather than diamond configuration, and with posts instead of ground-level bases.

1753
 Invention of hollow-pipe drainage is credited to Sir Hugh Dalrymple who died in 1753.

1765
 James Hargreaves invented the spinning jenny, which was a multi-spindle spinning frame, and was one of the key developments in the industrialisation of textile manufacturing during the early Industrial Revolution.
 James Small advances the design of the plough using mathematical methods to improve on the Scotch plough of James Anderson of Hermiston.

1767
 Adam Ferguson (1767), often known as 'The Father of Modern Sociology', publishes his work An Essay on the History of Civil Society.

1776
 Scottish economist Adam Smith, often known as 'The father of modern economics', publishes his seminal text The Wealth of Nations.
 The Watt steam engine, conceived in 1765, goes into production. It is the first type of steam engine to make use of steam at a pressure just above atmospheric.

1779
 Samuel Crompton invented the spinning mule, which improved the industrialised production of thread for textile manufacture. The spinning mule combined features of James Hargreaves' spinning jenny and Richard Arkwright's water frame.

1781
 The Iron Bridge, the first arch bridge made of cast iron, is built by Abraham Darby III.

1783
 A pioneer of selective breeding and artificial selection, Robert Bakewell, forms the Dishley Society to promote and advance the interests of livestock breeders.

1786
 The threshing machine is invented by Andrew Meikle.

1798
 Edward Jenner invents the first vaccine.

19th century

1802
 Sir Humphry Davy creates the first incandescent light by passing a current from a battery, at the time the world's most powerful, through a thin strip of platinum.

1804
 The world's first locomotive-hauled railway journey is made by Richard Trevithick's steam locomotive.

1807
 Alexander John Forsyth invents percussion ignition, the foundation of modern firearms.

1814
 Robert Salmon patents the first haymaking machine.

c1820 
 John Loudon McAdam develops the Macadam road construction technique.

1822
 Charles Babbage proposes the idea for a Difference engine, an automatic mechanical calculator designed to tabulate polynomial functions, in a paper to the Royal Astronomical Society entitled "Note on the application of machinery to the computation of astronomical and mathematical tables".

1823
 An improved system of soil drainage is developed by James Smith.

1824
 William Aspdin obtains a patent for Portland cement (concrete).

1825
 William Sturgeon invents the electromagnet.

1828
 A mechanical reaping machine is invented by Patrick Bell.

1831
 Electromagnetic induction, the operating principle of transformers and nearly all modern electric generators, is discovered by Michael Faraday.

1835
 Scotsman James Bowman Lindsay invents the incandescent light bulb.

1836
 The Marsh test for detecting arsenic poisoning is developed by James Marsh.

1837
 Charles Babbage describes an Analytical Engine, the first mechanical, general-purpose programmable computer.
 The Cooke and Wheatstone telegraph, first commercially successful electric telegraph, is designed by Sir Charles Wheatstone and Sir William Fothergill Cooke.

1839
 A pedal bicycle is invented by Kirkpatrick Macmillan.

1840
 Sir Rowland Hill reforms the postal system with Uniform Penny Post and introduces the first postage stamp, the Penny Black, on 1 May.

1841
 Alexander Bain patents his design produced the prior year for an electric clock.

1842
 Superphosphate, the first chemical fertiliser, is patented by John Bennet Lawes.

1843
 SS Great Britain, the world's first steam-powered, screw propeller-driven passenger liner with an iron hull is launched. Designed by Isambard Kingdom Brunel, it was at the time the largest ship afloat.
 Alexander Bain patents a design for a facsimile machine.

1846
 A design for a chemical telegraph is patented by Alexander Bain. Bain's telegraph is installed on the wires of the Electric Telegraph Company on one line. Later, in 1850, it was used in America by Henry O'Reilly.

1847
 Boolean algebra, the basis for digital logic, is introduced by George Boole in his book The Mathematical Analysis of Logic.

1851
 Improvements to the facsimile machine are demonstrated by Frederick Bakewell at the 1851 World's Fair in London.

1852
 A steam-driven ploughing engine is invented by John Fowler.

1853
 Scottish physician Alexander Wood develops a medical hypodermic syringe with a needle fine enough to pierce the skin.

1854
 The Playfair cipher, the first literal digraph substitution cipher, is invented by Charles Wheatstone and later promoted for use by Lord Playfair.

1868
 Mushet steel, the first commercial steel alloy, is invented by Robert Forester Mushet.
 Thomas Humber develops a bicycle design with the pedals driving the rear wheel.
 The first manually operated gas-lamp traffic lights are installed outside the Houses of Parliament on 10 December.

1869
 A bicycle design is developed by Thomas McCall.

1873
 Discovery of the photoconductivity of the element selenium by Willoughby Smith. This led to the invention of photoelectric cells (solar panels), including those used in the earliest television systems.

1876
 Scotsman Alexander Graham Bell patents the telephone in the U.S.
 The first safety bicycle is designed by the English engineer Harry John Lawson (also called Henry). Unlike the penny-farthing, the rider's feet were within reach of the ground, making it safer to stop.

1878
 Demonstration of an incandescent light bulb by Joseph Wilson Swan.

1883
 The Fresno scraper, which became a model for modern earth movers, is invented in California by Scottish emigrant James Porteous.

1884
 The light switch is invented by John Henry Holmes, Quaker of Newcastle.
 Reaction steam turbine invented by Anglo-Irish engineer Charles Algernon Parsons.

1885
 The first commercially successful safety bicycle, called the Rover, is designed by John Kemp Starley. The following year Dan Albone produces a derivative of this called the Ivel Safety cycle.

1886
 Walter Parry Haskett Smith, often called the Father of Rock Climbing in Britain, completes his first ascent of the Napes Needle, solo and without any protective equipment.

1892
 Sir Francis Galton devises a method for classifying fingerprints that proved useful in forensic science.

1897
 Sir Joseph John Thomson discovers the electron.
 The world's first wireless station is established on the Isle of Wight.

20th century

1901
 The first wireless signal across the Atlantic is sent from Cornwall in England and received in Newfoundland in Canada (a distance of 2,100 miles) by Italian scientist Guglielmo Marconi.
 The first commercially successful light farm tractor is patented by Dan Albone.

1902
 Edgar Purnell Hooley develops Tarmac

1906

1907
 Henry Joseph Round discovers electroluminescence, the principle behind LEDs.

1910
 The first formal driving school, the British School of Motoring, is founded in London.
 Frank Barnwell establishes the fundamentals of aircraft design at the University of Glasgow, having made the first powered flight in Scotland the previous year.

1916
 The first use in battle of the military tank (although the tank was also developed independently elsewhere).

1918
 The Royal Air Force becomes the first independent air force in the world
 The introduction of HMS Argus the first example of the standard pattern of aircraft carrier, with a full-length flight deck that allowed wheeled aircraft to take off and land.

1922
 In Sorbonne, France, Englishman Edwin Belin demonstrates a mechanical scanning device, an early precursor to modern television.

1926
 John Logie Baird makes the first public demonstration of a mechanical television on 26 January (the first successful transmissions were in early 1923 and February 1924). Later, in July 1928, he demonstrated the first colour television.

1930
 The jet engine is patented by Sir Frank Whittle.

1932
 The Anglepoise lamp is patented by George Carwardine, a design consultant specialising in vehicle suspension systems.

1933
 The Cat's eye road marking is invented by Percy Shaw and patented the following year.

1936
 English economist John Maynard Keynes publishes his work The General Theory of Employment, Interest and Money which challenged the established classical economics and led to the Keynesian Revolution in the way economists thought.
 The world's first public broadcasts of high-definition television are made from Alexandra Palace, North London, by the BBC Television Service. It is the first fully electronic television system to be used in regular broadcasting.

1937
 First available in the London area, the 999 telephone number is introduced as the world's first emergency telephone service.

1939
 The initial design of the Bombe, an electromechanical device to assist with the deciphering of messages encrypted by the Enigma machine, is produced by Alan Turing at the Government Code and Cypher School (GC&CS).

1943
 Colossus computer begins working, the world's first electronic digital programmable computer.

1949
 The Manchester Mark 1 computer, significant because of its pioneering inclusion of index registers, ran its first programme error free. Its chief designers are Freddie Williams and Tom Kilburn.

1951
 The concept of microprogramming is developed by Maurice Wilkes from the realisation that the Central Processing Unit (CPU) of a computer could be controlled by a miniature, highly specialised computer program in high-speed ROM.
 LEO is the first business application (a payroll system) on an electronic computer.

1952
 The introduction of the de Havilland Comet the world's first commercial jet airliner.
 Autocode, regarded as the first compiled programming language, is developed for the Manchester Mark 1 by Alick Glennie.

1953
 Englishman Francis Crick and American James Watson of Cavendish Laboratory in the University of Cambridge, analysed X-ray crystallography data taken by Rosalind Franklin of King's College London, to decipher the double helical structure of DNA. They share the 1962 Nobel Prize in Medicine for their work.

1955
 The first accurate atomic clock, a caesium standard based on a certain transition of the caesium-133 atom, is built by Louis Essen at the National Physical Laboratory.  This clock enabled further development of general relativity, and started a basis for an enhanced SI unit system.

1956
 Metrovick 950, the first commercial transistor computer, is built by the Metropolitan-Vickers company.

1961
 The first electronic desktop calculators, the ANITA Mk7 and ANITA Mk8, are manufactured by the Bell Punch Company and marketed by its Sumlock Comptometer division.

1963
 High strength carbon fibre is invented by engineers at the Royal Aircraft Establishment.
 The Lava lamp is invented by British accountant Edward Craven Walker.

1964
 The first theory of the Higgs boson is put forward by Peter Higgs, a particle-physics theorist at the University of Edinburgh, and five other physicists. The particle is discovered in 2012 at CERN's Large Hadron Collider and its existence is confirmed in 2013.

1965
 A pioneer of the development of dairy farming systems, Rex Paterson, set out his principles for labour management.
 The Touchscreen was invented by E.A.Johnson working at the Radar Research Establishment, Malvern, Worcestershire.

1966
 The cash machine and personal identification number system are patented by James Goodfellow.

1969
 The first carbon fibre fabric in the world is weaved in Stockport, England.

1970
 One of the first handheld televisions, the MTV-1, is developed by Sir Clive Sinclair.

1973
 Clifford Cocks develops the algorithm for the RSA cipher while working at the Government Communications Headquarters, approximately three years before it was independently developed by Rivest, Shamir and Adleman at MIT. The British government declassified the 1973 invention in 1997.

1976
 M. Stanley Whittingham develops the first Lithium-ion battery, while working as a researcher for ExxonMobil.

1977
 Steptoe and Edwards successfully carried out a pioneering conception which resulted in the birth of the world's first baby to be conceived by IVF, Louise Brown on 25 July 1978, in Oldham General Hospital, Greater Manchester, UK.

1979
 The tree shelter is invented by Graham Tuley to protect tree seedlings.
 One of the first laptop computers, the GRiD Compass, is designed by Bill Moggridge.

1984
 DNA profiling is discovered by Sir Alec Jeffreys at the University of Leicester.
 One of the world's first computer games to use 3D graphics, Elite, is developed by David Braben and Ian Bell.

1989
 Sir Tim Berners-Lee writes a proposal for what will become the World Wide Web. The following year, he specified HTML, the hypertext language, and HTTP, the protocol.
 The Touchpad pointing device is first developed for Psion computers.

1991
 A patent for an iris recognition algorithm is filed by John Daugman while working at the University of Cambridge which became the basis of all publicly deployed iris recognition systems.
 The source code for the world's first web browser, called WorldWideWeb (later renamed Nexus to avoid confusion with the World Wide Web), is released into the public domain by Sir Tim Berners-Lee.

1992
 The first SMS message in the world is sent over the UK's GSM network.

1995
 The world's first national DNA database is developed.

1996
  Animal cloning, a female domestic sheep became the first mammal cloned from an adult somatic cell, by scientists at the Roslin institute.

1997
Scottish scientists at the Roslin Institute in Edinburgh, produce the first mammal cloned from an adult cell.
 The ThrustSSC jet-propelled car, designed and built in England, sets the land speed record.

21st century

2003
 Beagle 2, a British landing spacecraft that forms part of the European Space Agency's 2003 Mars Express mission lands on the surface of Mars but fails to communicate. It is located twelve years later in a series of images from NASA's Mars Reconnaissance Orbiter that suggest two of Beagle's four solar panels failed to deploy, blocking the spacecraft's communications antenna.

2004
 Graphene is isolated from graphite at the University of Manchester by Andre Geim and Konstantin Novoselov.

2005
 The design for a machine to lay rail track, the "Trac Rail Transposer", is patented and goes on to be used by Network Rail in the United Kingdom and the New York City Subway in the United States.

2012
 Raspberry Pi,  a single-board computer, is launched and quickly becomes popular for education in programming and computer science.

2014
 The European Space Agency's Philae lander leaves the Rosetta spacecraft and makes the first ever landing on a comet. The Philae lander was built with significant British expertise and technology, alongside that of several other countries.

2016
 SABRE or Synergetic Air Breathing Rocket Engine is an example of a Rocket-Jet hybrid hypersonic air-breathing rocket engine.

2020
 Became the first country in the world to deploy an approved COVID-19 vaccine

Ceramics
Bone china – Josiah Spode
Ironstone china – Charles James Mason
Jasperware – Josiah Wedgwood

Clock making

Anchor escapement – Robert Hooke
Balance wheel – Robert Hooke
Coaxial escapement – George Daniels
Grasshopper escapement, H1, H2, H3 and H4 watches (a watch built to solve the longitude measurement problem) – John Harrison
Gridiron pendulum – John Harrison
Lever escapement The greatest single improvement ever applied to pocket watches – Thomas Mudge
Longcase clock or grandfather clock – William Clement
Marine chronometer – John Harrison
Self-winding watch – John Harwood

Clothing manufacturing
Derby Rib (stocking manufacture) – Jedediah Strutt
Flying shuttle – John Kay
Mauveine, the first synthetic organic dye – William Henry Perkin
Power loom – Edmund Cartwright
Spinning frame – John Kay
Spinning jenny – James Hargreaves
Spinning mule – Samuel Crompton
Sewing machine – Thomas Saint in 1790
Water frame – Richard Arkwright
Stocking frame – William Lee
Warp-loom and Bobbinet – John Heathcoat

Communications
Christmas card – Sir Henry Cole
Clockwork radio – Trevor Baylis
Electromagnetic induction & Faraday's law of induction Began as a series of experiments by Faraday that later became some of the first ever experiments in the discovery of radio waves and the  development of radio – Michael Faraday
Fiber optics pioneer in telecommunications – Charles K. Kao and George Hockham
 Geostationary satellites concept originator for the use of telecommunications relays – Arthur C Clarke
Kennelly–Heaviside layer first proposed, a layer of ionised gas that reflects radio waves around the Earth's curvature – Oliver Heaviside
 Light signalling between ships: Admiral Philip H. Colomb (1831–1899) 
Mechanical pencil – Sampson Mordan and John Isaac Hawkins in 1822.
 Pencil – Cumbria, England
 Pitman Shorthand – Isaac Pitman
 Adhesive postage stamp and the postmark – James Chalmers (1782–1853) 
 Radar – Robert Watson-Watt (1892–1973)
 Radio, the first transmission using a Spark Transmitter, achieving a range of approximately 500 metres.  – David E. Hughes
 Underlying principles of Radio  – James Clerk Maxwell (1831–1879) 
 Radio communication development pioneer– William Eccles
 Roller printing – Thomas Bell (patented 1783) 
 Long-lasting materials for today's liquid crystal displays – Team headed by Sir Brynmor Jones and Developed by Scotsman George Gray and Englishman Ken Harrison In conjunction with the Royal Radar Establishment and the University of Hull
 Shorthand – Timothy Bright (1550/1-1615).  Invented first modern shorthand
 Developed 'binaural sound' for the Stereo– Alan Blumlein
 Print stereotyping – William Ged (1690–1749) 
 Teletext Information Service – The British Broadcasting Corporation (BBC)
 Totalisator – George Julius
 Typewriter – First patent for a device similar to a typewriter granted to Henry Mill in 1714.
 Teleprinter – Frederick G. Creed (1871–1957) 
 Universal Standard Time: Sir Sandford Fleming (1827–1915) 
 Valentines card – Modern card 18th century England

Computing
ACE and Pilot ACE – Alan Turing
ARM architecture The ARM CPU design is the microprocessor architecture of 98% of mobile phones and every smartphone.
Atlas, an early supercomputer and was the fastest computer in the world until the release of the American CDC 6600. This machine introduced many modern architectural concepts: spooling, interrupts, instruction pipelining, interleaved memory, virtual memory and paging – Team headed by Tom Kilburn
The first graphical computer game OXO on the EDSAC at Cambridge University – A.S. Douglas
First computer generated music was played by the Ferranti Mark 1 computer – Christopher Strachey
Denotational semantics – Christopher Strachey pioneer in programming language design
Deutsch–Jozsa algorithm and first universal quantum computer described – David Deutsch
Digital audio player – Kane Kramer
EDSAC was the first complete, fully functional computer to use the von Neumann architecture, the basis of every modern computer – Maurice Wilkes
EDSAC 2  the successor to the Electronic Delay Storage Automatic Calculator or EDSAC. It was the first computer to have a microprogrammed (Microcode) control unit and a bit slice hardware architecture – Team headed by Maurice Wilkes
Ferranti Mark 1 –  Also known as the Manchester Electronic Computer was the first computer to use the principles of early CPU design (Central processing unit) – Freddie Williams and Tom Kilburn – Also the world's first successful commercially available general-purpose electronic computer.
Flip-flop circuit, which became the basis of electronic memory (Random-access memory) in computers – William Eccles and F. W. Jordan
Conceptualised Integrated Circuit – Geoffrey W.A. Dummer
Josephson effect and theorised Pi Josephson junction and Josephson junction – Brian David Josephson
Heavily involved in the development of the Linux kernel – Andrew Morton & Alan Cox
Manchester Baby was the world's first electronic stored-program computer. Developed by Frederic Calland Williams & Tom Kilburn
Osborne 1 The first commercially successful portable computer, the precursor to the Laptop computer – Adam Osborne
Packet switching co-invented by British engineer Donald Davies and American Paul Baran – National Physical Laboratory, London England
First PC-compatible palmtop computer (Atari Portfolio) – Ian H. S. Cullimore
First programmer – Ada Lovelace
First Programming Language Analytical Engine ordercode – Charles Babbage and Ada Lovelace
(Psion Organiser) world's first handheld computer – Psion PLC
First experimental quantum algorithm demonstrated on a working 2-qubit NMR quantum computer used to solve Deutsch's problem - Jonathan A. Jones.
The first rugged computer – Husky (computer)
Sumlock ANITA calculator the world's first all-electronic desktop calculator – Bell Punch Co
Sinclair Executive was the first 'slimline' pocket calculator, amongst other electrical/electronic innovations – Sir Clive Sinclair
Co-Inventor of the first trackball device – developed by Tom Cranston, Fred Longstaff and Kenyon Taylor
Universal Turing machine – The UTM model is considered to be the origin of the "stored program computer" used by John von Neumann in 1946 for his "Electronic Computing Instrument" that now bears von Neumann's name: the von Neumann architecture, also UTM is considered the first operating system – Alan Turing
Williams tube – a cathode ray tube used to electronically store binary data (Can store roughly 500 to 1,000 bits of data) – Freddie Williams & Tom Kilburn
Wolfram's 2-state 3-symbol Turing machine – Stephen Wolfram

Engineering
Adjustable spanner – Edwin Beard Budding
Backhoe loader – Joseph Cyril Bamford
First coke-consuming Blast Furnace – Abraham Darby I
First working and volume production Brushless Alternator – Newage Engineers
Carey Foster bridge – Carey Foster
Cavity magnetron – John Randall and Harry Boot critical component for Microwave generation in Microwave ovens and high powered Radios (Radar)
First compression ignition engine aka the Diesel Engine – Herbert Akroyd Stuart
Hydraulic crane – William George Armstrong
Crookes tube the first cathode ray tubes  – William Crookes
The first electrical measuring instrument, the electroscope – William Gilbert
Fourdrinier machine – Henry Fourdrinier
Francis turbine – James B. Francis
Gas turbine – John Barber (engineer)
Hot air engine (open system) – George Cayley
Hot bulb engine or heavy oil engine – Herbert Akroyd Stuart
Hydraulic accumulator
The world's first house powered with hydroelectricity – Cragside, Northumberland
Hydrogen Fuel Cell – William Robert Grove
Internal combustion engine – Samuel Brown
light-emitting diode (did not invent the first visible light, only theorised) – H. J. Round
Linear motor is a multi-phase alternating current (AC) electric motor – Charles Wheatstone then improved by Eric Laithwaite
First person to person to publicly predict and describe (although not the inventor) of the Microchip – Geoffrey W.A. Dummer
Microturbines – Chris and Paul Bladon of Bladon Jets
The world's first oil refinery and a process of extracting paraffin from coal laying the foundations for the modern oil industry – James Young (1811–1883)
Pendulum governor – Frederick Lanchester
Modified version of the Newcomen steam engine (Pickard engine) – James Pickard
Contributed to the development of Radar – Scotsman Robert Watson-Watt and Englishman Arnold Frederic Wilkins
Pioneer of radio guidance systems – Archibald Low
Screw-cutting lathe – Henry Hindley
The first industrially practical screw-cutting lathe – Henry Maudslay
Devised a standard for screw threads leading to its widespread acceptance – Joseph Whitworth
Rectilinear Slide rule – William Oughtred
Compound steam turbine – Charles Algernon Parsons
Stirling engine – Robert Stirling
Supercharger – Dugald Clerk
 Electric transformer – Michael Faraday
Two-stroke engine – Joseph Day
The Wimshurst machine is an Electrostatic generator for producing high voltages – James Wimshurst
Wind tunnel – Francis Herbert Wenham
Vacuum diode also known as a vacuum tube – John Ambrose Fleming

Household appliances
Perambulator – William Kent designed a baby carriage in 1733
Collapsible baby buggy – Owen Maclaren
Domestic dishwasher – key modifications by William Howard Livens
"Bagless" vacuum cleaner – James Dyson
"Puffing Billy" – First powered vacuum cleaner – Hubert Cecil Booth
Fire extinguisher – George William Manby
Folding carton – Charles Henry Foyle
 Lawn mower – Edwin Beard Budding
Rubber band – Stephen Perry
Daniell cell – John Frederic Daniell
Tin can – Peter Durand
Corkscrew – Reverend Samuell Henshall
Mouse trap – James Henry Atkinson
Modern flushing toilet – John Harington
 The pay toilet – John Nevil Maskelyne, Maskelyne invented a lock for London toilets, which required a penny to operate, hence the euphemism "spend a penny".
Electric toaster – Rookes Evelyn Bell Crompton
Teasmade – Albert E. Richardson
Magnifying glass – Roger Bacon
Thermosiphon, which forms the basis of most modern central heating systems – Thomas Fowler
Automatic electric kettle – Russell Hobbs
Thermos Flask – James Dewar
Toothbrush – William Edward Addis
Sunglasses – James Ayscough
 The Refrigerator – William Cullen (1748) 
 The Flush toilet: Alexander Cummings (1775) 
 The first distiller to triple distill Irish whiskey:John Jameson (Whisky distiller)
 The first automated can-filing machine John West (1809–1888) 
 The waterproof Mackintosh – Charles Macintosh (1766–1843) 
 The kaleidoscope: Sir David Brewster (1781–1868) 
 Keiller's marmalade Janet Keiller (1797) – The first recipe of rind suspended marmalade or Dundee marmalade produced in Dundee.
 The modern lawnmower – Edwin Beard Budding (1830) 
 The Lucifer friction match: Sir Isaac Holden (1807–1897) 
 The self filling pen – Robert Thomson (1822–1873) 
 Cotton-reel thread – J & J Clark of Paisley
 Lime Cordial – Peter Burnett in 1867 
 Bovril beef extract – John Lawson Johnston in 1874  
 Wellington Boots
 Can Opener – Robert Yeates 1855

Ideas, religion and ethics
 Agnosticism by Thomas Henry Huxley
 Anglicanism by Henry VIII of England
 Classical Liberalism – John Locke known as the "Father of Classical Liberalism".
 Malthusianism and the groundwork for the study of population dynamics – Thomas Robert Malthus with his work An Essay on the Principle of Population.
 Methodism by John Wesley and Charles Wesley
 Quakerism by George Fox
 Utilitarianism by Jeremy Bentham

Industrial processes
English crucible steel – Benjamin Huntsman
Steel production Bessemer process – Henry Bessemer
Hydraulic press – Joseph Bramah
Parkesine, the first man-made plastic – Alexander Parkes
Portland cement – Joseph Aspdin
Sheffield plate – Thomas Boulsover
Water frame – Richard Arkwright
Stainless steel – Harry Brearley
Rubber Masticator – Thomas Hancock
Power Loom – Edmund Cartwright
Parkes process – Alexander Parkes
Lead chamber process – John Roebuck
Development of the world's first commercially successful manufacture of high quality flat glass using the float glass process – Alastair Pilkington
The first commercial electroplating process – George Elkington
The Wilson Yarn Clearer – Peter Wilson
Float Glass –  Alastair Pilkington – Modern Glass manufacturing process
Contact Process
Froth Flotation – William Haynes and A H Higgins.
Extrusion – Joseph Bramah

Medicine
First correct description of circulation of the blood – William Harvey
Smallpox vaccine – Edward Jenner with his discovery is said to have "saved more lives (...) than were lost in all the wars of mankind since the beginning of recorded history."
Surgical forceps – Stephen Hales
Antisepsis in surgery – Joseph Lister
Artificial intraocular lens transplant surgery for cataract patients – Harold Ridley
Clinical thermometer – Thomas Clifford Allbutt.
 isolation of fibrinogen ("coagulable lymph"), investigation of the structure of the lymphatic system and description of red blood cells by the surgeon William Hewson (surgeon)
Credited with discovering how to culture embryonic stem cells in 1981 – Martin Evans
First blood pressure measurement and first cardiac catheterisation-Stephen Hales
Pioneer of anaesthesia and father of epidemiology for locating the source of cholera – John Snow (physician)
pioneered the use of sodium cromoglycate as a remedy for asthma – Roger Altounyan
The first scientist to demonstrate that a cancer may be caused by an environmental carcinogen and one of the founders of orthopedy – Percivall Pott
Performed the first successful blood transfusion – James Blundell
Discovered the active ingredient of Aspirin – Edward Stone
Discovery of Protein crystallography – Dorothy Crowfoot Hodgkin
The world's first successful stem cell transplant – John Raymond Hobbs
First typhoid vaccine – Almroth Wright
Pioneer of the treatment of epilepsy – Edward Henry Sieveking
discovery of Nitrous oxide (entonox/"laughing gas") and its anaesthetic properties – Humphry Davy
Computed Tomography (CT scanner) – Godfrey Newbold Hounsfield
Gray's Anatomy widely regarded as the first complete human anatomy textbook – Henry Gray
Discovered Parkinson's disease – James Parkinson
General anaesthetic – Pioneered by Scotsman James Young Simpson and Englishman John Snow
Contributed to the development of magnetic resonance imaging (MRI) – Sir Peter Mansfield
Statistical parametric mapping – Karl J. Friston
Nasal cannulaWilfred Jones
The development of in vitro fertilization – Patrick Christopher Steptoe and Robert Geoffrey Edwards
First baby genetically selected to be free of a breast cancer – University College London
Viagra – Peter Dunn, Albert Wood, Dr Nicholas Terrett
Acetylcholine – Henry Hallett Dale
EKG (underlying principles) – various
Discovery of vitamins – Frederick Gowland Hopkins
 Earliest pharmacopoeia in English
The hip replacement operation, in which a stainless steel stem and 22mm head fit into a polymer socket and both parts are fixed into position by PMMA cement – pioneered by John Charnley
In vitro fertilisation – Developed by Sir Robert Geoffrey Edwards with a first successful birth in 1978 as a result of natural cycle IVF where no stimulation was made.
Description of Hay fever – John Bostock (physician) in 1819
 Pioneering the use of surgical anaesthesia with Chloroform: Sir James Young Simpson (1811–1870) 
 Discovery of hypnotism (November 1841) – James Braid (1795–1860) 
 Identifying the mosquito as the carrier of malaria: Sir Ronald Ross (1857–1932) 
 Identifying the cause of brucellosis: Sir David Bruce (1855–1931) 
 Discovering the vaccine for typhoid fever: Sir William B. Leishman (1865–1926) 
 Discovering insulin – John J R Macleod (1876–1935) with others 
 Ambulight PDT: light-emitting sticking plaster used in photodynamic therapy (PDT) for treating non-melanoma skin cancer. Developed by Ambicare Dundee's Ninewells Hospital and St Andrews University. (2010)
 Primary creator of the artificial kidney (Professor Kenneth Lowe – Later Queen's physician in Scotland) 
 Developing the first beta-blocker drugs: Sir James W. Black in 1964 
 Glasgow Coma Scale: Graham Teasdale and Bryan J. Jennett (1974) 
 EKG [Electrocardiography]: Alexander Muirhead (1911) 
 Pioneering the use of surgical anaesthesia with Chloroform: Sir James Young Simpson (1811–1870) 
 Discovery of hypnotism (November 1841) – James Braid (1795–1860) 
 Identifying the cause of brucellosis: Sir David Bruce (1855–1931) 
 Development of ibuprofen
 Discovering the vaccine for typhoid fever: Sir William B. Leishman (1865–1926) 
 The earliest discovery of an antibiotic, penicillin: Sir Alexander Fleming (1881–1955) 
 Discovering an effective tuberculosis treatment: Sir John Crofton in the 1950s 
 Primary creator of the artificial kidney (Professor Kenneth Lowe – Later Queen's physician in Scotland) 
 Developing the first beta-blocker drugs: Sir James W. Black in 1964 
 EKG [Electrocardiography]: Alexander Muirhead (1911) 
 Discovering secretin, the first hormone, and its role as a chemical messenger: William Bayliss and Ernest Starling.

Military
Aircraft carrier – 
Angled Flight Deck, Optical Landing System and Steam catapult for Aircraft Carriers-Dennis Cambell CB DSC, Nicholas Goodhart and Commander Colin C. Mitchell RNVR respectively
Armstrong Gun – Sir William Armstrong
Bailey bridge – Donald Bailey
Battle Tank/The tank – During WWI, developed separately in Britain and France, and first used in combat by the British. In Britain designed by Walter Gordon Wilson and William Tritton.
Bouncing bomb – Barnes Wallis
Bullpup firearm configuration – Thorneycroft carbine
Chobham armour
Congreve rocket – William Congreve
Depth charge
Dreadnought battleship – 
The side by side Boxlock action, AKA the double barreled shotgun – Anson and Deeley
Percussion ignition
Turret ship – Although designs for a rotating gun turret date back to the late 18th century,  was the first warship to be outfitted with one.
Fairbairn–Sykes fighting knife – William Ewart Fairbairn and Eric A. Sykes
Fighter aircraft – The Vickers F.B.5 Gunbus of 1914 was the first of its kind.
Safety fuse – William Bickford
H2S radar (airborne radar to aid bomb targeting) – Alan Blumlein
Harrier jump jet – VTOL (Vertical take-off and landing aircraft)
High explosive squash head – Sir Charles Dennistoun Burney
Livens Projector – William Howard Livens
The first self-powered machine gun Maxim gun – Sir Hiram Maxim, Although the Inventor is American, the Maxim gun was financed by Albert Vickers of Vickers Limited company and produced in Hatton Garden London
Mills bombthe first modern fragmentation grenade.
Nuclear fission chain reaction – Leo Szilard whilst crossing the road near Russell Square.
Puckle Gun – James Puckle
Rubber bullet and Plastic bullet – Developed by the Ministry of Defence during The Troubles in Northern Ireland.
Self-propelled gun - The Gun Carrier Mark I was the first piece of Self-propelled artillery ever to be produced.
Shrapnel shell – Henry Shrapnel
 Smokeless propellant to replace gunpowder with the use of Cordite – Frederick Abel
The world's first practical underwater active sound detection apparatus, the ASDIC Active Sonar – Developed by Canadian physicist Robert William Boyle and English physicist Albert Beaumont Wood
Special forces – SAS Founded by Sir David Stirling.
Stun grenades – invented by the Special Air Service in the 1960s.
Torpedo – Robert Whitehead
The Whitworth rifle, considered the first sniper rifle. During the American Civil War the Whitworth rifle had been known to kill at ranges of about  – Sir Joseph Whitworth

Mining
Beam engine – Used for pumping water from mines
Davy lamp – Humphry Davy
Geordie lamp – George Stephenson
Tunnel boring machine – James Henry Greathead and Isambard Kingdom Brunel

Musical instruments
Concertina – Charles Wheatstone
Theatre organ – Robert Hope-Jones
Logical bassoon, an electronically controlled version of the bassoon – Giles Brindley
Northumbrian smallpipes
Tuning fork – John Shore
 The piano footpedal – John Broadwood (1732–1812)

Photography
Ambrotype – Frederick Scott Archer
Calotype – William Fox Talbot
Cinematography – William Friese-Greene
Collodion process – Frederick Scott Archer
Collodion-albumen process – Joseph Sidebotham in 1861
Dry plate process also known as gelatine process, is the first economically successful durable photographic medium – Richard Leach Maddox
First Film called "The Horse in Motion" in 1878 – Eadweard Muybridge
Kinetoscope the first Motion picture camera  – William Kennedy Laurie Dickson
Kinemacolor was the first successful colour motion picture process, used commercially from 1908 to 1914 – George Albert Smith
The first movie projector, the Zoopraxiscope – Eadweard Muybridge
Photographic negative - William Fox Talbot
Thomas Wedgwood – pioneer of photography, devised the method to copy visible images chemically to permanent media.
Single-lens reflex camera and earliest Panoramic Camera with wide-angle lens - Thomas Sutton
Stereoscope – Charles Wheatstone

Publishing firsts
Oldest publisher and printer in the world (having been operating continuously since 1584):  Cambridge University Press
first book printed in English: "The Recuyell of the Historyes of Troye" by Englishman William Caxton in 1475
 The first edition of the Encyclopædia Britannica (1768–81) 
 The first English textbook on surgery(1597) 
 The first modern pharmacopoeia, William Cullen (1776) The book became 'Europe's principal text on the classification and treatment of disease' 
 The first postcards and picture postcards in the UK

Science
Triple achromatic lens – Peter Dollond
Joint first to discover alpha decay via quantum tunnelling – Ronald Wilfred Gurney
Alpha and Beta rays discovered – Ernest Rutherford
Argon element discovered– John Strutt, 3rd Baron Rayleigh with Scotsman William Ramsay
Atom (nuclear model of) discovered– Ernest Rutherford
Atomic theory – Considered the father of modern chemistry, John Dalton's experiments with gases led to the development of what is called the modern atomic theory.
Atwood machine used for illustrating the law of uniformly accelerated motion – George Atwood
Barometer (Marine) – Robert Hooke
Bell's theorem – John Stewart Bell
Calculus – Sir Isaac Newton
Cell biology – Credit for the discovery of the first cells is given to Robert Hooke who described the microscopic compartments of cork cells in 1665
Chromatography (Partition) – Richard Laurence Millington Synge and Archer J.P. Martin
Coggeshall slide rule – Henry Coggeshall
Correct theory of combustion – Robert Hooke
Coumarin synthesised, one of the first synthetic perfumes, and cinnamic acid via the Perkin reaction – William Henry Perkin
Dew Point Hygrometer – John Frederic Daniell
Earnshaw's theorem – Samuel Earnshaw
Electrical generator (dynamo) – Michael Faraday
Electromagnet – William Sturgeon in 1823.
Electron and isotopes discovered – J. J. Thomson
Equals sign Robert Recorde
Erbium-doped fibre amplifier - Sir David N. Payne
Faraday cage – Michael Faraday
First Law of Thermodynamics demonstrated that electric circuits obey the law of the conservation of energy and that electricity is a form of energy . Also the unit of energy, the Joule is named after him – James Prescott Joule
Hawking radiation – Stephen Hawking
Helium – Norman Lockyer
Holography – First developed by Dennis Gabor in Rugby, England. Improved by Nicholas J. Phillips who made it possible to record multi-colour reflection holograms
Hooke's Law (equation describing elasticity) – Robert Hooke
Infrared radiation – discovery commonly attributed to William Herschel.
Iris diaphragm – Robert Hooke
The Law of Gravity – Sir Isaac Newton
Magneto-optical effect – Michael Faraday
Mass spectrometer invented -  J. J. Thomson
Maxwell's equations - James Clerk Maxwell
Micrometer – William Gascoigne
Micrometer (first bench one) that was capable of measuring to one ten thousandth of an inch – Henry Maudslay
Neutron discovered – James Chadwick
Newtonian telescope – Sir Isaac Newton
Newton's laws of motion – Sir Isaac Newton
First full-scale commercial Nuclear Reactor at Calder Hall, opened in 1956.
Nuclear transfer – Is a form of cloning first put into practice by Ian Wilmut and Keith Campbell to clone Dolly the Sheep
Oxygen gas (O2) discovered – Joseph Priestley
Pell's equation – John Pell
Penrose graphical notation – Roger Penrose
Periodic Table – John Alexander Reina Newlands
pion and (pi-meson) discovered – Cecil Frank Powell
Pre-empting elements of General Relativity theory – William Kingdon Clifford
Proton discovered – Ernest Rutherford
Radar pioneering development – Arnold Frederic Wilkins
Rayleigh scattering, form of Elastic scattering discovered - John William Strutt, 3rd Baron Rayleigh
Seismograph – John Milne  
Sinclair Executive, the world's first small electronic pocket calculator – Sir Clive Sinclair
Slide rule – William Oughtred
Standard deviation – Francis Galton
Symbol for "is less than" and "is greater than" – Thomas Harriot 1630
Theory of Evolution – Charles Darwin
Thomson scattering - J. J. Thomson
Weather map – Sir Francis Galton
Wheatstone bridge – Samuel Hunter Christie
"×" symbol for multiplication as well as the abbreviations "sin" and "cos" for the sine and cosine functions – William Oughtred

Astronomy
Discovery of the "White Spot" on Saturn – Will Hay
Discovery of Proxima Centauri, the closest known star to the Sun, by Robert Innes (1861–1933) 
Discovery of the planet Uranus and the moons Titania, Oberon, Enceladus, Mimas by Sir William Herschel (German born astronom, later in life British)
Discovery of Triton and the moons Hyperion, Ariel and Umbriel  – William Lassell
Planetarium – John Theophilus Desaguliers
Predicts the existence and location of Neptune from irregularities in the orbit of Uranus – John Couch Adams
Important contributions to the development of radio astronomy – Bernard Lovell
Newtonian telescope – Sir Isaac Newton
Achromatic doublet lens – John Dollond
Coining the phrase 'Big Bang' – Fred Hoyle
First theorised existence of black holes, binary stars; invented torsion balance – John Michell
Stephen Hawking – World-renowned theoretical physicist made many important contributions to the fields of cosmology and quantum gravity, especially in the context of black holes
Spiral galaxies – William Parsons, 3rd Earl of Rosse
Discovery of Halley's Comet – Edmond Halley
Discovery of pulsars – Antony Hewish
Discovery of Sunspots and was the first person to make a drawing of the Moon through a telescope – Thomas Harriot
 The Eddington limit, the natural limit to the luminosity of stars, or the radiation generated by accretion onto a compact object – Arthur Stanley Eddington
Aperture synthesis, used for accurate location and imaging of weak radio sources in the field of Radio astronomy – Martin Ryle and Antony Hewish

Chemistry
Aluminium first discovered – Sir Humphry Davy
Concept of atomic number introduced to fix inadequacies of Mendeleev's periodic table, which had been based on atomic weight – Henry Moseley
Baconian method, an early forerunner of the scientific method – Sir Francis Bacon
Benzene first isolated, the first known aromatic hydrocarbon – Michael Faraday
Boron first isolated  – Humphry Davy
Bragg's law and establish the field of X-ray crystallography, an important tool for elucidating the crystal structure of substances – William Henry Bragg and William Lawrence Bragg
Buckminsterfullerene discovered  – Sir Harry Kroto
Callendar effect the theory that linked rising carbon dioxide concentrations in the atmosphere to global temperature (Global warming) – Guy Stewart Callendar
Chemical Oceanography established : Robert Boyle.
Dalton's law and Law of multiple proportions – John Dalton
The structure of DNA and pioneering the field of molecular biology – co-developed by Francis Crick   and the American James Watson
DNA sequencing by chain termination – Frederick Sanger
Electrolysis and electrochemistry discovered : William Nicholson and Anthony Carlisle.
Chemical Fertilizer invented : John Lawes
Structure of Ferrocene discovered – Geoffrey Wilkinson & others  
Pioneer of the Fuel Cell – Francis Thomas Bacon
Henderson limit - Richard Henderson
Hydrogen discovered  as a colorless, odourless gas that burns and can form an explosive mixture with air – Henry Cavendish
Introns discovered in eukaryotic DNA and the mechanism of gene-splicing – Richard J. Roberts
Concept of Isotopes first proposed, elements with the same chemical properties may have differing atomic weights – Frederick Soddy
Josephson voltage standard - Brian Josephson
Kerosene invented : Abraham Gesner and James Young.
Kinetic theory of gases  developed : James Maxwell.
Proposes the law of octaves, a precursor to the Periodic Law – John Newlands
Pioneer of Meteorology by developing a nomenclature system for clouds in 1802  – Luke Howard
Potassium first isolated – Humphry Davy
Rayleigh scattering explains why the sky is blue, and predicted the existence of the surface waves – John Strutt, 3rd Baron Rayleigh
Silicones discovered : Frederic Kipping.
Publishes Opus Maius, which among other things, proposes an early form of the Scientific Method, and contains results of his experiments with Gunpowder – Roger Bacon  
Publishes several Aristotelian commentaries, an early framework for the Scientific Method – Robert Grosseteste
Sodium first isolated  – Humphry Davy
Thallium discovered  – William Crookes
Valence discovered : Edward Frankland.
Chemical composition of Water discovered : Henry Cavendish.
Weston cell – Edward Weston (chemist)
The synthesising of Xenon hexafluoroplatinate the first time to show that noble gases can form chemical compounds – Neil Bartlett

Sport
Football – The rules as we know them today were established in 1848 at Cambridge University, Sheffield F.C. is acknowledged by The Football Association and FIFA as the world's first and oldest football club.
Rugby – William Webb Ellis
Cricket – the world's second-most popular sport can be traced back to the 13th century
Tennis – widely known to have originated in England.
Boxing – England played a key role in the evolution of modern boxing. Boxing was first accepted as an Olympic sport in Ancient Greece in 688 BC
 Golf – Modern game invented in Scotland
 Billiards
 Badminton
Darts – a traditional pub game, the numbering layout was devised by Brian Gamlin
Table-Tennis – was invented on the dinner tables of Britain as an indoor version of tennis
Snooker – Invented by the British Army in India
Ping pong – The game has its origins in England, in the 1880s
Bowls – has been traced to 13th century England
Field hockey – the modern game grew from English public schools in the early 19th century
Netball – the sport emerged from early versions of women's basketball, at Madame Österberg's College in England during the late 1890s.
Rounders – the game originates in England most likely from an older game known as stool ball
The Oxford and Cambridge Boat Race, the first race was in 1829 on the River Thames in London
Thoroughbred Horseracing – Was first developed in 17th and 18th century England
Polo – its roots began in Persia as a training game for cavalry units, the formal codification of the rules of modern Polo as a sport were established in 19th century England
The format of Modern Olympics – William Penny Brookes
 The first Paralympic games competition were held in England in 1948 – Ludwig Guttmann
Hawk-Eye ball tracking system.

Transport
Pedal driven bicycle - Kirkpatrick Macmillan

Aviation
Aeronautics and flight. As a pioneer of glider development & first well-documented human flight he discovered and identified the four aerodynamic forces of flight – weight, lift, drag, and thrust. Modern airplane design is based on those discoveries including cambered wings. He is sometimes called the "Father of aviation" – George Cayley
Steam-powered flight with the Aerial Steam Carriage – John Stringfellow – The world's first powered flight took place at Chard in Somerset 55 years before the Wright brothers attempt at Kitty Hawk
VTOL (vertical take-off and landing) fighter-bomber aircraft – Hawker P.1127, designed by Sydney Camm
The first commercial jet airliner (de Havilland Comet)
The first Supersonic Airliner – Concorde. Developed by the British Aircraft Corporation in partnership with Aérospatiale 1969
The first aircraft capable of supercruise – English Electric Lightning
Ailerons – Matthew Piers Watt Boulton
Head-up display (HUD) – The Royal Aircraft Establishment (RAE) designed the first equipment and it was built by Cintel with the system first integrated into the Blackburn Buccaneer. 
Pioneer of parachute design – Robert Cocking
 The first human-powered aircraft to make an officially authenticated take-off and flight (SUMPAC) – The University of Southampton
Hale rockets, improved version of the Congreve rocket design that introduced Thrust vectoring –  William Hale
SABRE engine- The first hypersonic jet/rocket capable of working in air and space to allow the possibility of HOTOL.
Air Force – Royal Air Force

Railways
 Great Western Railway – Isambard Kingdom Brunel
 Stockton and Darlington Railway the world's first operational steam passenger railway
 First inter-city steam-powered railway – Liverpool and Manchester Railway

Locomotives
Blücher – George Stephenson
Puffing Billy -William Hedley
Locomotion No 1 – Robert Stephenson
Sans Pareil – Timothy Hackworth
Stourbridge Lion – Foster, Rastrick and Company
Stephenson's Rocket – George and Robert Stephenson
Salamanca – Matthew Murray
Flying Scotsman- Sir Nigel Gresley

Other railway developments
Displacement lubricator, Ramsbottom safety valve, the water trough, the split piston ring – John Ramsbottom
 Maglev (transport) rail system – Eric Laithwaite
 World's first underground railway and the first rapid transit system. It was also the first underground railway to operate electric trains – London Underground
Advanced Passenger Train (APT) was an experimental High Speed Train that introduced tilting – British Rail

Roads
Bowden cable – Frank Bowden
Hansom cab – Joseph Hansom
Seat belt – George Cayley
Sinclair C5 – Sir Clive Sinclair
Tarmac – E. Purnell Hooley
Tension-spoke wire wheels – George Cayley
LGOC B-type – the first mass-produced bus
Pneumatic tyre – Robert William Thomson is deemed to be inventor, despite John Boyd Dunlop being initially credited
Disc brakes – Frederick W. Lanchester
Belisha beacon – Leslie Hore-Belisha
Lotus 25: considered the first modern F1 race car, designed for the 1962 Formula One season; a revolutionary design, the first fully stressed monocoque chassis to appear in Formula One – Colin Chapman, Team Lotus
Horstmann suspension, tracked armoured fighting vehicle suspension – Sidney Horstmann
Steam fire engine – John Braithwaite
Penny-farthing – James Starley
Dynasphere – John Archibald Purves
Caterpillar track – Richard Lovell Edgeworth
Mini-roundabout – Frank Blackmore
Quadbike – Standard Motor Company patented the 'Jungle Airborne Buggy' (JAB) in 1944

Sea
Plimsoll Line – Samuel Plimsoll
Hovercraft – Christopher Cockerell
Lifeboat – Lionel Lukin
Resurgam – George Garrett
Transit (ship) – Richard Hall Gower
Turbinia, the first steam turbine powered steamship, designed by the engineer Sir Charles Algernon Parsons and built in Newcastle upon Tyne
Diving Equipment/Scuba Gear – Henry Fleuss
Diving bell – Edmund Halley
Sextant – John Bird
Octant (instrument) – Independently developed by Englishman John Hadley and the American Thomas Godfrey
Whirling speculum, This device can be seen as a precursor to the gyroscope – John Serson
Screw propeller – Francis Pettit Smith
The world's first patent for an underwater echo ranging device (Sonar) – Lewis Fry Richardson
hydrophone Before the invention of Sonar convoy escort ships used them to detect U-boats, greatly lessening the effectiveness of the submarine – Research headed by Ernest Rutherford
Hydrofoil – John Isaac Thornycroft
Inflatable boat
 The world's first iron armoured and iron hulled warship.

Scientific innovations
 The theory of electromagnetism – James Clerk Maxwell (1831–1879) 
 The Gregorian telescope – James Gregory (1638–1675) 
 The concept of latent heat – Joseph Black (1728–1799) 
 The pyroscope, atmometer and aethrioscope scientific instruments: Sir John Leslie (1766–1832) 
 Identifying the nucleus in living cells – Robert Brown (1773–1858) 
 Hypnotism – James Braid (1795–1860) 
 Transplant rejection: Professor Thomas Gibson (1940s) the first medical doctor to understand the relationship between donor graft tissue and host tissue rejection and tissue transplantation by his work on aviation burns victims during World War II.
 Colloid chemistry – Thomas Graham (1805–1869) 
 The kelvin SI unit of temperature – William Thomson, Lord Kelvin (1824–1907) 
 Devising the diagramatic system of representing chemical bonds – Alexander Crum Brown (1838–1922) 
 Criminal fingerprinting – Henry Faulds (1843–1930) 
 The noble gases: Sir William Ramsay (1852–1916) 
 The Cloud chamber – Charles Thomson Rees Wilson (1869–1959)  
 Pioneering work on nutrition and poverty – John Boyd Orr (1880–1971) 
 The ultrasound scanner – Ian Donald (1910–1987) 
 Ferrocene synthetic substances – Peter Ludwig Pauson in 1955  
 The MRI body scanner – John Mallard and James Huchinson from (1974–1980) 
 The first cloned mammal (Dolly the Sheep): Was conducted in The Roslin Institute research centre in 1996 
 Seismometer innovations thereof – James David Forbes
 Metaflex fabric innovations thereof – University of St. Andrews (2010) application of the first manufacturing fabrics that manipulate light in bending it around a subject. Before this such light manipulating atoms were fixed on flat hard surfaces. The team at St Andrews are the first to develop the concept to fabric.
 Macaulayite: Dr Jeff Wilson of the Macaulay Institute, Aberdeen.

Miscellaneous
 Oldest police force in continuous operation:  Marine Police Force founded in 1798 and now part of the Metropolitan Police Service
 Oldest life insurance company in the world:  Amicable Society for a Perpetual Assurance Office founded 1706
 First Glee Club, founded in Harrow School in 1787.
Oldest arts festival – Norwich 1772 
Oldest music festival – The Three Choirs Festival
Oldest literary festival – The Cheltenham Literature Festival
Bayko – Charles Plimpton
Linoleum – Frederick Walton
Chocolate bar – J. S. Fry & Sons
Meccano – Frank Hornby
Crossword puzzle – Arthur Wynne
Gas mask – (disputed) John Tyndall and others
Graphic telescope – Cornelius Varley
Steel-ribbed Umbrella – Samuel Fox
Plastic – Alexander Parkes
Plasticine – William Harbutt
Carbonated soft drink – Joseph Priestley
Friction Match – John Walker
Invented the rubber balloon – Michael Faraday
The proposal of a new decimal metrology which predated the Metric system – John Wilkins
Edmondson railway ticket – Thomas Edmondson
The world's first Nature Reserve – Charles Waterton *Public Park – Joseph Paxton
Scouts – Robert Baden-Powell, 1st Baron Baden-Powell
Spirograph – Denys Fisher
The Young Men's Christian Association YMCA was founded in London – George Williams
The Salvation Army, known for being one of the largest distributors of humanitarian aid – Methodist minister William Booth
Prime meridian – George Biddell Airy
Produced the first complete printed translation of the Bible into English – Myles Coverdale
Founder of the Bank of Scotland – John Holland
Venn diagram – John Venn
Vulcanisation of rubber – Thomas Hancock
Silicone – Frederick Kipping
Pykrete –  Geoffrey Pyke
Vantablack – The world's blackest known substance
Stamp collecting – John Edward Gray bought penny blacks on first day of issue in order to keep them
 lorgnette – George Adams
Boys' Brigade
Bank of England devised by William Paterson
Bank of France devised by John Law
Colour photography: the first known permanent colour photograph was taken by James Clerk Maxwell (1831–1879) 
 Barnardos
 Boy Scouts
 Girl Guides
 RSPCA
 RSPB
 RNLI

See also
Economic history of the United Kingdom
List of English inventions and discoveries
List of English inventors and designers
List of Scottish inventions and discoveries
List of Welsh inventors
Manufacturing in the United Kingdom
Science and technology in the United Kingdom
Science in Medieval Western Europe
Timeline of Irish inventions and discoveries

References

Further reading

 
 
 

 
Invention
Inventions
Lists of inventions or discoveries
Inventions
Inventions

ms:Perekaan dan penemuan Inggeris